Dutch Courage is a live album by American hardcore punk band Poison Idea.  It was released in 1991 on Blitzcore.

Track listing 

 Plastic Bomb 
 Just to Get Away
 Getting the Fear
 Painkiller
 Hangover Heartattack
 Time to Go
 Cop an Attitude
 Feel the Darkness
 Give It Up
 Taken by Surprise
 A.A
 Alan's on Fire
 Marked for Life
 We Got It
 Kick Out
 Short Fuse
 A.A.
 Give It Up
 The Badge

References

Poison Idea albums
1991 live albums